Mitogen-activated protein kinase 12 is an enzyme that in humans is encoded by the MAP3K12 gene.

Function 

The protein encoded by this gene is a member of serine/threonine protein kinase family. This kinase contains a leucine-zipper domain, and is predominately expressed in neuronal cells. The phosphorylation state of this kinase in synaptic terminals was shown to be regulated by membrane depolarization via calcineurin. This kinase forms heterodimers with leucine zipper containing transcription factors, such as cAMP responsive element binding protein (CREB) and MYC, and thus may play a regulatory role in PKA or retinoic acid induced neuronal differentiation.

Interactions 

MAP3K12 has been shown to interact with MAPK8IP1, MAP2K7 and MAPK8IP2.

Role in development 

MAP3K12, otherwise known as DLK, can initiate coordinated signalling cascades that culminate in the phosphorylation of C-Jun N-terminal kinases or JNK. Several experiments have implicated this interaction as having a role in the developing mammalian nervous system. For example, neuronal migration and axon growth are critical components of neuronal development. DLK null mice have defects in neuronal migration, hypoplasia of several different axonal tracts and reduced axon number in various areas of the brain such as the cingulum and internal capsule. In addition, inhibition of DLK or JNK delays radial migration and disrupts the formation of the neocortex in mice. Another important function of the developing mammalian nervous system is neuronal apoptosis. The absence of DLK also protects cultured mice sensory neurons from apoptosis that would normally be triggered by a lack of NGF. This, among other experiments, heavily implicates it as having a role in neuronal apoptosis.

DLK has several different interactions that contribute to mammalian nervous system development. For axon growth, DLK phosphorylates MAP2K4/7 which then phosphorylates JNK, activating it. In neuronal migration DLK phosphorylates MAP2K4/7 which phosphorylates JNK, and also interacts with JIP which then interacts with MAP2K4/7 and JNK. There is a similar interaction for neuronal apoptosis, where DLK phosphorylates JIP3 and MAP2K7, which both phosphorylate JNK. It is evident then that DLK interactions are a versatile and critical part of neuronal development in mammals.

References

Further reading 

 
 
 
 
 
 
 
 
 
 
 
 
 
 
 

EC 2.7.11